Wakendorf I is a municipality in the district of Segeberg, in Schleswig-Holstein, Germany. The name "Wakendorf I" was given in Prussian times, in order to distinguish it from another municipality 20 km to the southwest, also called Wakendorf.

Geography and transport
Wakendorf I lies about 20 km south-southeast of the district capital Bad Segeberg and about six kilometers north of Bad Oldesloe near the Trave. It has a small train station on the Neumünster–Bad Oldesloe railway.

References

Municipalities in Schleswig-Holstein
Segeberg